James Edward Slattery (August 25, 1904 in Buffalo, New York – August 30, 1960) was an American professional boxer in the light heavyweight (175 lb) division. He was inducted into the Greater Buffalo Sports Hall of Fame in 1992, Buffalo Veteran Boxers Association Ring #44 in 1997 and the International Boxing Hall of Fame in 2006.

Professional career

World light heavyweight champion
Slattery, son of a Buffalo fire fighter, turned pro in 1921 and came up short in his challenge for the World Light Heavyweight Title against Paul Berlenbach in 1925. His KO loss in 1925 to Dave Shade was named Ring Magazine Upset of the Year. Slattery won the vacant NBA light heavyweight title in August 1927 with a decision over Maxie Rosenbloom, only to lose it to Tommy Loughran in December of that year.

He won the NYSAC World Light Heavyweight Title by beating Lou Scozza on February 10, 1930 in Broadway Auditorium.  Slattery lost the title later that year in a bout at Bison Stadium against Maxie Rosenbloom for the NYSAC World Light Heavyweight Title and the Undisputed World Light Heavyweight Title.  The verdict was "highly unpopular" with the 15,000 fans at the fight. The United Press score sheet gave Rosenbloom eight rounds and Slattery four, with three even. Referee Patsy Haley, after being almost knocked out by one of Rosenbloom's wild swings, gave his decision to Slattery. He was overruled by two judges, both of whom voted for Rosenbloom.

Death and legacy
Alcoholism almost certainly shortened Slattery's life, career and marriage (he had famously eloped with 19-year-old Elizabeth A. Pendergast). In 1943, his second wife, Mildred, had him committed to the alcoholic ward at Bellevue Hospital. 
During the Great Depression, Slattery was known to throw money out of the window of his car while driving through the streets in order to help the poor children buy new shoes for school. A play about Slattery's life, Jimmytown, written by Anthony Cardinale, was produced in Buffalo in 1997; Jimmy Slattery Place, in South Buffalo, was named in his honor in 2006. A diagnosis of tuberculosis significantly impacted his health during the last decades of his life. Slattery died of pulmonary tuberculosis on August 30, 1960, in Buffalo, New York. His former wife, Elizabeth Ann Burgess (née Pendergast) died in 1998; they had divorced in 1940.

Professional boxing record
All information in this section is derived from BoxRec, unless otherwise stated.

Official record

All newspaper decisions are officially regarded as “no decision” bouts and are not counted in the win/loss/draw column.

Unofficial record

Record with the inclusion of newspaper decisions in the win/loss/draw column.

References

External links
 
Cyber Boxing Zone bio
 Buffalo sports hall of fame
 International Boxing Hall of Fame

Sources
LIGHT HEAVY
 Blake, Rich. Slats: the Legend and Life of Jimmy Slattery. Buffalo, NY: No Frills Books, 2015.
 Tim Graham, "A good life scotched", Buffalo News 8-22-2006.
 Tim Graham, "Toast of the town", Buffalo News 8-20-2006.
 Tim Graham, "Ceremony to unveil Slattery Place", Buffalo News 8-22-2006.
 Terry Doran, "Fighting trim, 'Jimmytown', the ring of truth", Buffalo News 9-19-1997.
 "James E. Slattery III, worked in finance", Buffalo News 7-22-99, Obit.
 "Elizabeth A. Burgess, eloped with boxing champion", Buffalo News 1-26-98, Obit.

|-

|-

1904 births
Sportspeople from Buffalo, New York
World boxing champions
1960 deaths
American male boxers
Light-heavyweight boxers